Brahma is the Hindu Creator God.

Brahma may also refer to:

 "Brahma" (poem), a poem by Ralph Waldo Emerson
 Brahma (1994 film), Indian Bollywood film
 Brahma (2014 film), Indian Action historical drama film
 Brahma (Buddhism), a Buddhist concept
 Brahma (chicken), a breed of chicken
 Brahma (protein complex), a protein composed of SWI/SNF homologs
 Brahman (cattle), a breed of cattle also known as Brahma
 Brahma beer, a Brazilian beer

See also 
 
 
 Fort Worth Brahmas, an American professional ice hockey team
 Brahm (disambiguation)
 Brahman (disambiguation)
 Brahmin (disambiguation)